Endotricha puncticostalis is a species of snout moth in the genus Endotricha. It was described by Francis Walker in 1866, and is known from Australia, the Selayar Islands, Christmas Island, the Philippines, Sumba, Java, and Sulawesi.

References

Moths described in 1866
Endotrichini